Atanas Atanasov (born 14 July 1985 in Pleven) is a Bulgarian footballer who plays as a defender. His role on the pitch is left wingback.

Career
Atanasov started to play football at Spartak Pleven, but at the age of 18 moved to Chernomorets Burgas and during season 2003-04 made his debut in the A PFG. After that he played also in Vidima-Rakovski Sevlievo and Belite orli. In January 2008 Atanasov returned to his first club Spartak Pleven. Some six months later signed a contract with Beroe Stara Zagora and during season 2008-09 with the club he became champion of the second division. Atanasov was part of the Dunav Ruse squad that earned consecutive promotions to First League and finished 4th in the top flight at the end of the 2016–17 campaign. He left the club in June 2017.

Statistics

Honours

Club
 Beroe
Bulgarian Cup:
Winner: 2009-10

References

External links
 Profile at beroe.eu
 

1985 births
Living people
Bulgarian footballers
First Professional Football League (Bulgaria) players
FC Chernomorets Burgas players
PFC Vidima-Rakovski Sevlievo players
PFC Spartak Pleven players
PFC Beroe Stara Zagora players
FC Lokomotiv 1929 Sofia players
FC Etar 1924 Veliko Tarnovo players
PFC Lokomotiv Plovdiv players
FC Dunav Ruse players
Association football defenders
Sportspeople from Pleven